The Albania Davis Cup team represents Albania in Davis Cup tennis competition and are governed by the Albanian Tennis Federation.

Albania currently compete in the Europe Zone Group IV, and have been doing so since the 2019 edition. Previously The Albanian Davis Cup team competed in Europe Zone Group III before alterations were made to the Davis Cup format. They first started competing in the Davis Cup competition in 2010.

Players

Recent performances

(i) = Played on an indoor court

2010s

2020s

Notes

References

External links

Davis Cup teams
Davis Cup
Davis Cup